Ksamil is a village and a former municipality in the riviera of Southern Albania, and part of Butrint National Park. At the 2015 local government reform it became a subdivision of the municipality Sarandë. The population at the 2011 census was 2,994; while according to the Civil Offices it was 9,220. The municipal unit consists of the villages Ksamil and Manastir. During the communist era, the coastal village of Ksamil was built in 1966 and is located south of the city of Sarandë off the road to Butrint.

Ksamil is one of the most frequented coastal resorts by both domestic and foreign tourists. Ksamil Beach and Albania's Ionian Coast further north was included in the Guardian's 20 of the best bargain beach holidays for 2013. The main attractions are the nearby Ksamil Islands. The Caribbean white sand beaches in Ksamil gave the town great tourist boost. Albanians from Kosovo and other Albanian-speaking areas visited Ksamil in recent years, but more and more international tourists are visiting the beach. This leads, for example, to new hotel facilities, but also to more expensive prices. Other activities are the Blue Eye in Muzinë, the Butrint National Park, Saranda and as well some other minor beaches that lie north to Ksamil.

During communism, the area became well known for the production of olive oil, lemons, and tangerines. In 2010, national authorities demolished over 200 illegal structures that violated the town's master plan and the integrity of Butrint National Park. Some remains from the demolished buildings have yet to be removed by authorities.

Demographics 
In 1992, the village of Ksamil was inhabited by a mixed population of Muslim Albanians (1125), Orthodox Albanians (210) and Greeks (520).

According to official estimates (2014) the population of the commune of Ksamil numbered 9,215, of whom 4,207 were members of the Greek minority, seven of the Aromanian minority, and the rest Albanians.

Gallery

See also
Tourism in Albania
Albanian Riviera
Geography of Albania
List of islands of Albania

References

External links
Lonely Planet Ksamil

Beaches of Albania
Greek communities in Albania
Former municipalities in Vlorë County
Seaside resorts in Albania
Administrative units of Sarandë
Villages in Vlorë County
Labëria